The Purple Line is a future San Diego Trolley line proposed by SANDAG, that would run from San Ysidro Transit Center at the United States–Mexico border to Kearny Mesa with a possible extension to Carmel Valley. It would run along or in the median of I-805 and I-15. Most of the proposed station locations are currently served by Rapid routes 225 and 235. The Purple Line could include up to 14 new Trolley stations, a new support facility and yard, and require the purchase of 60 additional Trolley cars to provide the needed level of service on the line.  Projected ridership on the Purple Line is expected to be over 40,000 daily trips with a peak hour frequency of 7-10 minutes.

History

Planning
In April 2011, the San Diego Association of Governments (SANDAG) released a draft of its 2050 Regional Transportation Plan, which was approved by the SANDAG Board of Directors on October 28, 2011. An inland Trolley line from San Ysidro to Kearny Mesa, though not yet called the Purple Line, was included in the plan.

Line name announced
In April 2019, SANDAG approved the final version of a November ballot initiative to increase the countywide sales tax by a half cent which further detailed future transit plans and specifically mentions and estimates the cost to build the proposed San Ysidro-Kearney Mesa trolley extension. It was then given its official title, the Purple Line.

Proposed Stations
Potential stations according to the SANDAG plan could include:
San Ysidro Transit Center
I-905 at I-805
Palm Avenue 
East Palomar Street, Chula Vista
H Street, edge of Chula Vista
Westfield Plaza Bonita, Bonita
East Plaza Boulevard, National City
47th Street (transfer to Orange Line), Southeast San Diego
University Avenue, City Heights
El Cajon Boulevard, City Heights
Stadium station (transfer to Green Line), Mission Valley
Ridgehaven Court/Balboa Avenue, Kearny Mesa
Kaiser Permanente/Ruffin Road, Kearny Mesa
Overland Avenue, Kearny Mesa

References

San Diego Trolley lines
Proposed public transportation in California
Proposed railway lines in California